Helder may refer to:

 Den Helder or The Helder, a municipality and a city in the Netherlands
 Anglo-Russian invasion of Holland in 1799, or expedition to the "Helder"

People 
 Anne-Marie Helder (21st century), British singer-songwriter
 Glenn Helder (born 1968), Dutch footballer
 Lilian Helder (born 1973), Dutch politician
 Liza Helder (born 1989), Aruban model and beauty pageant titleholder
 Luke Helder (born 1981), American bomber
 John Helder Wedge (1793–1872), Tasmanian politician

Arts 
 "Helder" (comics), a short comics story by Chester Brown

See also 
 Hélder, a Portuguese masculine given name

Dutch-language surnames